Jeremy Shawn Vanderloop (born April 28, 1988) is an American Christian musician, who primarily plays indie rock music. He has released three studio album, The Rescue (2010), All Creation Sings (2012), and No Death (2016). Vanderloop released an extended play, Love Is in the Air, in 2011.

Early and background
Jeremy Shawn Vanderloop was born on April 28, 1988, and he was raised in Clearwater, Florida.

Music history
His music career began in 2010, with the studio album, The Rescue, on May 4, 2010. The subsequent release, an extended play, Love Is in the Air, was released in 2011. He released, All Creation Sings, on October 2, 2012, with Mosaic Artistry Group.

Discography
Studio albums
 The Rescue (May 4, 2010)
 All Creation Sings (October 2, 2012, Mosaic Artistry)
 No Death  (April 29, 2016)
EPs
 Love Is in the Air'' (April 12, 2011)

References

External links
 

1988 births
American performers of Christian music
Living people
People from Clearwater, Florida
Singers from Florida
Songwriters from Florida
21st-century American singers
21st-century American male singers
American male songwriters